The Seville Shipyards is a medieval shipyard in the city of Seville (Andalusia, Spain). They were operative between the 13th and 15th centuries, and are built in Gothic style.

They were specialized in the construction of galleys, which played an important role in the struggles for the control of the Strait of Gibraltar, as well as in the Castilian participation in the Hundred Years' War. The complex consisted of a building with seventeen naves next to a large sandy area that reached to the edge of the Guadalquivir River. 

On March 13, 1969, the State declares Monumento Histórico Artístico to the Shipyards, and on June 18, 1985 the degree of protection of the property declaring the Maestranza de Artillería de Sevilla (which occupies the seven naves that are conserved and other structures, such as a front pavilion) Bien de Interés Cultural in the Monument category.

Background 
The first news about shipyards in the city dates back to the 1st century BC, when the civil war between Pompey and Julius Caesar took place:

In the 9th century a series of Norman attacks (Vikings) occurred on the peninsular coasts, one of them in Seville. This motivated Caliph Abd ar-Rahman II to reinforce the wall of Isbylia (Seville) (of Roman origin) and to create a permanent war fleet. To this end, he ordered the construction of some shipyards in Seville:

Some 200 years later, in 1184, the caliph Abu Yusuf Yaqub al-Mansur ordered the then governor of the city, Abu Dawud Yalul ben Yildasan the manufacture of some shipyards where, in a short space of time, build a large fleet to deal with the Christian kingdoms.

t is not known with certainty where the former shipyards were located. According to the archaeological work carried out, it is known that the Castilian shipyards that are still in use today were not built on any previous ones.

Original design 
Ferdinand III of Castile, conquered Seville from the Muslims in 1248. After making conquests for a large part of the peninsula, he decided to undertake military campaigns to also take the north of Africa and thus prevent possible threats that could come from that area. He decided to build several ships and galleys in Seville. However, Fernando dies in 1252 and his son, Alfonso X of Castile "the Wise", agrees with the usefulness of creating a fleet and orders the construction of the shipyards.

The site chosen was a site outside the walled enclosure and very close to the Guadalquivir River, in the area between Torre del Oro, Torre de la Plata, the Postigo del Carbón gate and the Postigo del Aceite gate.

For this reason, in the neighborhood of El Arenal 17 naves from brick factory were erected perpendicular to the Guadalquivir and in front of the Almohad walls of the city, covering about 15,000 square meters.

The Atarazanas also included the so-called Resolana del Río, a large expanse of sand that reached the Guadalquivir. It was one of the largest industrial installations of the Late Middle Ages in Europe, of an extension comparable to that at that time by the Venetian Arsenal.

Architecturally it is a Gothic work and Mudéjar built all of it in a brick factory, which shows the influence of Almohad art in medieval constructions in the city of Seville. Astonish the dimensions of its wide and long naves attached and covered by vaults of edge, appropriate for the construction of the largest ships of the time. These naves communicate laterally through thick arches that are slightly pointed and facing each other, which start directly from the ground, and that together provoke attractive prospects inside.

Operation 

In 1253 there were already ten galleys built and King Alfonso appointed ten captains or commissars, some of them French and Italians who had come to collaborate in the Reconquista. The commissars and their heirs had to take care of and repair the galley that was delivered to them and always use it in the name of the king and under the dependence of the Major Admiral of Castile (a position created by Alfonso in 1254). In 1407, reigning John II of Castile, in Seville there were already 70 commissars. The Major Admiral of Castile also had voice and vote in the municipal council.

Besides as a shipyard, the Crown used the Shipyards for other functions since its first centuries of operation. Because of their large size, they served to host assemblies and public celebrations. They were also a natural place to store the booty and the prisoners captured by the fleets of the Castilian kings. Sometimes they served as jails for the social elite, for example for the nobles related to the king Peter of Castile after the victory of his rival Henry II of Castile.

The Shipyards were able to build frequently fleets of twenty galleys and, on special occasions, of up to thirty. The Castilian kings used them in the struggles for control of the Strait of Gibraltar against the Muslims and also in raids against England during the Hundred Years' War. For its construction and armament, a labor force of between 400 and 500 artisans was temporarily mobilized, who, in exchange for working for the Crown for half the usual salary, enjoyed great fiscal privileges throughout the year. For this reason they were called "francs". In addition, the Crown possessed in the Shipyards an indeterminate number of slaves, mainly Muslim prisoners, who were in charge of the most painful tasks. The wood for the construction of the ships was brought from forests owned by the Crown located in the Sierra Norte de Sevilla.

The naves could hold a large number of galleys and vessels, as well as all the equipment for assembly, repair and maintenance. The spoils of war were also kept there. Caulkers, carpenters, blacksmiths and other artisans worked inside it. Those who work there were under the authority of the alcaide of the Alcázar of Seville (the palace-fortress nearby) and the Shipyards. This warden was appointed by the king. The position of warden used to fall to a nobleman who, at times, delegated the exercise of his work to a man of trust.

In the first third of the 15th century the Shipyards set up its last large fleets of galleys. Fifteen ships were destined to an incursion against England in 1420 and an indeterminate number to the war against Aragon in 1430. After these contests, the orders of the Castilian kings became increasingly scarce. In the middle of the century the hulls of some twenty galleys, built but not armed, were rotting in their facilities.

During the last stages of the Reconquista the Catholic Monarchs installed the seat of their court in Seville. At the end of the 15th century, some of the repair works of the shipyards were carried out by order of the latter. Later, in 1493, the Catholic Monarchs approved that the fish market move from the Plaza de San Francisco square to the first nave (the one closest to the Postigo del Aceite gate) of the Shipyards. In that nave several fish markets and some houses were placed.

On February 14, 1503, on the occasion of the constitution of the Casa de Contratación de Indias, the nave was destined to the south as the headquarters of the Casa. However, on June 5, the headquarters of the Casa to the Alcázar would be moved. In 1587 the customs of the city was located on naves 13, 14 and 15, south of the building. Throughout the 16th century one nave was rented as an oil warehouse and another as a wool warehouse. The warden would be in charge of the surveillance of the site and the collection of all rentals . Another nave was destined for a mercury store, which was brought in bags of lamb skins from Almadén mines and then used to help extract silver in the American mines.

In addition to the need for warehouses, there were other reasons for the cessation of its use as shipyards. In the first place, after the end of the wars with England and the battles for the Strait of Gibraltar, the kingdom of Castile stopped needing fleets of war so frequently. Second, the architectural design of the Shipyards made them capable of building only galleys, and this type of vessel was losing combat capacity against novel designs of sailing ships such as the carrack and the nao, which were faster and stronger and had much greater range thanks to its less numerous crews. For the Crown it was also more economically advantageous to rent private sailships to its owners than to build and maintain permanent fleets of galleys. Finally, the ascent to the throne in 1475 of Isabella I and her husband Ferdinand II of Aragon (called the Catholic Monarchs years later) supposed that the sovereigns of Castile became available to the shipyards of galleys of the Crown of Aragon, which possibly were cheaper than the one in Seville.

Although the workload of the Shipyards was decreasing, the number of artisans officially linked to them was scarcely reduced. This provoked frequent protests by the Council of Seville about the injustice represented by the tax exemptions of these "francs" as well as other protected occupations. Among other tasks, until 1549 the fourth nave of the Shipyards was destined to the manufacture of pumps to reduce water in the boats, for what was known as "the fireman's nave".

In 1570 a large galley would be built in Barcelona that would be taken to Seville to be decorated with Renaissance allegorical motifs. This was the Capitana galley that was commanded by John of Austria during the Battle of Lepanto.

On June 5, 1593 King Philip II of Spain would prohibit by Royal Decree that the ships built in the Sevillian Shipyards be used for trips to the Indies, citing the worst quality of the wood used in them compared to the best quality of the shipyards from the north of Spain.

Little by little, the Shipyards abandoned its role as shipyards to be commercial warehouses. In addition to the aforementioned elements, sugar, ginger, cinnamon, medicinal plants and noble woods from the Indies were also stored. In the 18th century they were labeled with a sign that read:  "La Real Casa de Atarazanas de Azogues de Indias" (The Royal House of Shipyards of Markets of Indies).

Transformations and destruction 

Throughout its history, the building of the Royal Shipyards has undergone important transformations. At present, only seven of the seventeen original naves remain standing.

The first major architectural intervention on the building of the Shipyards took place in the year 1641 with the construction of Hospital de la Caridad and its church, which occupied five of the naves, whose arches can still be glimpsed today.

In 1719 the Government ordered that five naves pass to store artillery material, a function that had already been carried out by the Shipyards since 1587. In 1762 began a major reform of the Artillery Corps that would take over the years to the Real Maestranza de Artillería de Sevilla located in the Shipyards had a large warehouse of carriages and accoutrements to supply the troops, which resulted in an expansion in the capacity of workshops and warehouses with the annexation of two more naves to complete the seven that would occupy the Army until the 20th century. In 1782, the Maestranzas of Cádiz and Málaga merged into that of Seville, leaving it as the sole supplier for all Andalusia and Extremadura and, one year later, also for the Indias, which led to a new architectural operation that transformed part of the building and raised the current façade.

Apart from the construction of Hospital de la Caridad in the 17th century, the rest of the structure of the original building survived completely until 1945, when five of the buildings were demolished to make room for the construction of the current building of the Treasury Delegation.

The Shipyards of Seville have been declared Bien de Interés Cultural and cataloged as Monumento Nacional since 1969. In 1993 they became property of the Junta de Andalucía. In 2009, the Board assigned the building to the La Caixa financial entity for a period of 75 years in order to build a cultural dissemination center called CaixaForum Sevilla. At the end of 2012 La Caixa announced that it would build the Caixaforum in another part of the city, which sparked a conflict with the Junta de Andalucía that concluded with an agreement whereby the financial institution would invest 10 million euros in another cultural project different in the Shipyards.

Movie scenario 
The Shipyards of Seville were used as the setting for the series Game of Thrones to recreate the crypts of the Red Fortress. The filming took place in November 2016 for the seventh season.

References 

Buildings and structures completed in the 13th century
Buildings and structures in Seville
Gothic architecture in Andalusia
Shipyards of Spain
Bien de Interés Cultural landmarks in the Province of Seville